Bucher Rim is a rocky eminence on the southern portion of the rim of the extinct volcano Mount Takahe, in eastern Marie Byrd Land. It was mapped by the United States Geological Survey from surveys and from U.S. Navy tricamera aerial photos, 1959–66, and named by the Advisory Committee on Antarctic Names for Peter Bucher of the University of Bern, Switzerland, United States Antarctic Research Program glaciologist at Byrd Station, 1969–70.

References
 

Rock formations of Marie Byrd Land